Dragan Jelić (born 27 February 1986) is a retired Slovenian footballer who played as a forward.

Club career
Jelić started his career in the youth teams of Maribor where he signed his first professional contract. For a short period of time he also played for Çaykur Rizespor in the Turkish Super Lig before he returned home to Maribor. His best season at the club was 2009–10 when he scored 15 goals in the 1. SNL and was the best club goalscorer of the season. In the first half of 2011 he played for Willem II on loan, returning to Maribor in summer 2011, where he stayed until February 2012.

During the winter break of the 2013–14 season, he left Austrian side Kapfenberger SV and joined Serbian top division side Radnički Niš.

References

External links
 
 Player profile at NZS 
 

1986 births
Living people
Sportspeople from Maribor
Slovenian footballers
Association football forwards
NK Maribor players
Çaykur Rizespor footballers
PFC Krylia Sovetov Samara players
Willem II (football club) players
ND Mura 05 players
Kapfenberger SV players
FK Radnički Niš players
NK Rudar Velenje players
Slovenian PrvaLiga players
Süper Lig players
Russian Premier League players
Eredivisie players
2. Liga (Austria) players
Austrian Regionalliga players
Serbian SuperLiga players
I liga players
Slovenian expatriate footballers
Slovenian expatriate sportspeople in Turkey
Expatriate footballers in Turkey
Slovenian expatriate sportspeople in Russia
Expatriate footballers in Russia
Slovenian expatriate sportspeople in the Netherlands
Expatriate footballers in the Netherlands
Slovenian expatriate sportspeople in Austria
Expatriate footballers in Austria
Slovenian expatriate sportspeople in Serbia
Expatriate footballers in Serbia
Slovenian expatriate sportspeople in Poland
Expatriate footballers in Poland
Slovenia youth international footballers
Slovenia under-21 international footballers